Laali Haadu is a 2003 Indian Kannada-language romantic musical film directed by H. Vasu and written by Ajay Kumar. The film stars Darshan and Abhirami. The film was produced by Sa Ra Govindu under his home production Thanu Pictures. Two music directors V. Manohar and Rajesh Ramanath were seen in supporting roles.

The film was critically acclaimed upon release and went on to win Third Best Film award at the Karnataka State Film Awards for the year 2003. The songs composed by Sadhu Kokila became hits. Despite the positive reception, the film was a box office failure.

Plot

Cast

 Darshan as Puttaswamy alias Anand 
 Abhirami as Sangeetha
 Umashree as Anand's mother
 Ruthika
 Srinath
 Ramesh Bhat
 Sadhu Kokila as Tippeswamy
 Doddanna
 Kishan Shrikanth
 Amoolya
 Bank Janardhan
 Chitra Shenoy
 Padma Vasanthi
 Amulya
 V. Manohar (special appearance)
 Rajesh Ramanath (special appearance)

Soundtrack
The music of the film was composed by Sadhu Kokila and lyrics written by K. Kalyan.

References

External source

 

2003 films
2000s Kannada-language films
Indian romantic musical films
Indian musical drama films
Films scored by Sadhu Kokila
2000s romantic musical films